Graton is an unincorporated town and census-designated place (CDP) in west Sonoma County, California, United States. The population was 1,707 at the 2010 census. Graton's ZIP code is 95444. The town also has a culinary reputation attributed to two restaurants in the area.

The town of Graton is roughly 20 miles from the California coastline. Graton's agriculture was historically concentrated on apple farming, but like most of rural Sonoma County it now focuses on wine production.

Geography

Graton is located at the southeastern end of Green Valley, on the east bank of the seasonally flooding Atascadero Creek.

Graton is noted as lying at the approximate furthest southern and eastern extent of Russian colonization of the Americas. Research on Fort Ross has indicated that several farms were developed inland from the coastal fur trading fort in northwestern Sonoma County. These farms or ranches were used for producing additional food and for agricultural projects conducted by Fort Ross's agronomist Yegor Chernykh. In 1836, a farm was established along Purrington Creek, between what are now the towns of Occidental and Graton. There Chernykh erected barracks and five other structures, and grew vegetables, fruit, wheat, and other grains. Chernykh also developed a large vineyard, introducing what has since become a major crop in the area.

Climate
This region experiences warm (but not hot) and dry summers, with no average monthly temperatures above 71.6 °F.  According to the Köppen Climate Classification system, Graton has a warm-summer Mediterranean climate, abbreviated "Csb" on climate maps.

Demographics

2010
At the 2010 census Graton had a population of 1,707. The racial makeup of Graton was 1,402 (82.1%) White, 10 (0.6%) African American, 29 (1.7%) Native American, 25 (1.5%) Asian, 3 (0.2%) Pacific Islander, 144 (8.4%) from other races, and 94 (5.5%) from two or more races. Hispanic or Latino of any race were 322 people (18.9%).

The census reported that 99.2% of the population lived in households and 0.8% lived in non-institutionalized group quarters.

There were 680 households, 193 (28.4%) had children under the age of 18 living in them, 304 (44.7%) were opposite-sex married couples living together, 90 (13.2%) had a female householder with no husband present, 19 (2.8%) had a male householder with no wife present.  There were 35 (5.1%) unmarried opposite-sex partnerships, and 18 (2.6%) same-sex married couples or partnerships. 188 households (27.6%) were one person and 73 (10.7%) had someone living alone who was 65 or older. The average household size was 2.49.  There were 413 families (60.7% of households); the average family size was 3.03.

The age distribution was 343 people (20.1%) under the age of 18, 131 people (7.7%) aged 18 to 24, 352 people (20.6%) aged 25 to 44, 643 people (37.7%) aged 45 to 64, and 238 people (13.9%) who were 65 or older.  The median age was 45.9 years. For every 100 females, there were 90.7 males.  For every 100 females age 18 and over, there were 86.8 males. The median resident age is 48.2 years, compared to the California average of 36.2 years.

The homeowner vacancy rate was 0.6%; the rental vacancy rate was 2.6%. 72.0% of the population lived in owner-occupied housing units and 27.2% lived in rental housing units.

The median household income was $83,082 (+70.4% from 2000), and the median family income  was $87,641 (+53.9% from 2000). The median per capita income for the CDP was $35,410 (+62.1% from 2000). For comparison, statewide California median per capita income in the 2010 Census was $27,885 (+22.8% from 2000).

2000
At the 2000 census there were 1,815 people, 690 households, and 442 families in the CDP. The racial makeup of the CDP was 84.35% White, 0.50% African American, 1.49% Native American, 1.10% Asian, 0.06% Pacific Islander, 8.98% from other races, and 3.53% from two or more races. Hispanic or Latino of any race were 19.28%.

Of the 690 households 30.9% had children under the age of 18 living with them, 49.1% were married couples living together, 10.0% had a female householder with no husband present, and 35.9% were non-families. 27.5% of households were one person and 8.8% were one person aged 65 or older.  The average household size was 2.60 and the average family size was 3.21.

The age distribution was 24.3% under the age of 18, 8.2% from 18 to 24, 26.0% from 25 to 44, 31.0% from 45 to 64, and 10.5% 65 or older.  The median age was 40 years. For every 100 females, there were 97.5 males.  For every 100 females age 18 and over, there were 93.8 males.

The median household income was $48,750 and the median family income  was $56,944. Males had a median income of $45,179 versus $43,021 for females. The per capita income for the CDP was $21,844.  About 4.0% of families and 10.5% of the population were below the poverty line, including 8.1% of those under age 18 and 14.4% of those age 65 or over.

Government
Graton is represented by the following elected officials:
 Sonoma County Board of Supervisors (District 5): Lynda Hopkins (Dem)
 California State Assembly: 
 California State Senate: 
 U.S. House of Representatives (2nd District): 
 U.S. Senate: Dianne Feinstein (Dem) and Alex Padilla (Dem)

Notable people
George Segal, Academy Award-nominated actor and musician
Ned Kahn, artist, sculptor, MacArthur Fellow

References

External links
 Graton Day Labor Center
 Graton Community Services District
 Graton Fire Protection District 
 community website

Census-designated places in Sonoma County, California
Census-designated places in California